The Côte d'Ivoire International is an international badminton tournament held in Abidjan, Ivory Coast. The event is part of the Badminton World Federation's International Series and part of the Badminton Confederation of Africa's Circuit.

Past winners

Performances by nation

References

Badminton in Ivory Coast
2016 establishments in Africa